Saint Mary's Academy is a K-12 school located in Madawaska County, New Brunswick. Saint Mary's Academy is in the Anglophone West School District.

See also
 List of schools in New Brunswick
 Anglophone West School District

References

Schools in Madawaska County, New Brunswick
High schools in New Brunswick
Elementary schools in New Brunswick
Middle schools in New Brunswick
Buildings and structures in Edmundston